"Good God" is a song written and recorded by American nu metal band Korn for their second studio album, Life Is Peachy. It was released as the album's third single in November 1997.

Concept 
Jonathan Davis says about the song: "It's about a guy I knew in school who I thought was my friend, but who fucked me. He came into my life with nothing, hung out at my house, lived off me, and made me do shit I didn't really wanna do. I was into new romantic music and he was a mod, and he'd tell me if I didn't dress like a mod he wouldn't be my friend anymore. Whenever I had plans to go on a date with a chick he'd sabotage it, because he didn't have a date or nothing. He was a gutless fucking nothing. I haven't talked to him for years."

Music video 
There is an official live video included on the enhanced version of Life Is Peachy, recorded at the London Astoria.

Chart performance

Credits 
Jonathan Davis – vocals
Fieldy – bass
Munky – guitar
Head – guitar
David Silveria – drums
Additional
Ross Robinson – producer
Chuck Johnson – engineer
Chuck Johnson and Richard Kaplan – mixing

Track list

Australian release 
CD5" (664387 2)
"Good God" (Clean Version) – 3:35
"Need To" (live) – 3:54
"Good God" (Album Version) – 3:23
"Good God" (Heartfloor Remix) by Rammstein – 3:33
"Divine" (live) – 4:37
"Good God" (Such A Surge Remix) – 4:05

UK (Sony BMG) 
CD (2165)
"Good God" (Clean) – 3:30

UK maxi-single release #1 
CD5" (664658 2)
"Good God" (Album Version) – 3:20
"Good God" (Mekon Mix) – 5:32
"Good God" (Dub Pistols Mix) – 6:18
"Wicked" (Tear the Roof Off Mix) – 3:45
"Good God" (live video) – 3:40

US maxi-single Release 
CD (41417)
"Good God" (Heartfloor Remix) – 3:33
"Good God" (OOMPH! vs. Such A Surge Mix) – 4:09

UK maxi-single release #2 
CD5" (664658 5)
"Good God" (Album Version) – 3:20
"A.D.I.D.A.S." (Synchro Mix) – 4:29
"A.D.I.D.A.S." (Under Pressure Mix) – 3:55
"A.D.I.D.A.S." (The Wet Dream Mix) – 3:35

German release #2 
CD5" (664387 5)
"Good God" – 3:23
"Good God" (Heartfloor Remix) – 3:33
"Good God" (OOMPH! vs. Such A Surge Mix) – 4:09
"Good God" (Headknot Remix) – 7:12
"Good God" (Mekon Mix) – 5:33
"Good God" (Dub Pistols Mix) – 6:17

French remixes 
CD5" (664918)
"Good God" (Marc Em Remix) – 4:56
"Good God" (Oneyed Jack Remix Kronick Bass) – 5:19
"Good God" (Headknot Remix) – 7:12
"A.D.I.D.A.S." (Synchro Dub Mix) – 4:29
"Good God" – 3:23

References 

1997 singles
Korn songs
1996 songs
Epic Records singles
Songs written by Reginald Arvizu
Songs written by Jonathan Davis
Songs written by James Shaffer
Songs written by David Silveria
Songs written by Brian Welch